Hipnosis may refer to:

 Hipnosis (Italian band), an Italian synthpop group
 Hipnosis (Cuban band), a Cuban rock band
 Hipnosis (Chetes album),  2010
 Hipnosis (Jackie McLean album), 1978
 Hipnosis (Shootyz Groove album), 1997

See also

 Hipgnosis, an English art design group active from the late-1960s to the early-1980s
 Hypnosis, a state of human consciousness involving focused attention and reduced peripheral awareness characterized by enhanced capacity for response to suggestion